Vladimir Avilov (born 10 March 1995) is an Estonian professional footballer who plays as a centre back for Estonian club Nõmme Kalju and the Estonia national team.

Club career

Infonet
Avilov made his senior league debut in the Esiliiga on 3 April 2011. Infonet won the 2012 season and was promoted to the Meistriliiga, where Avilov made his debut on 2 March 2013. He won his first Meistriliiga title in the 2016 season.

Nõmme Kalju
On 21 February 2018, Avilov signed a three-year contract with Nõmme Kalju. He won his second Meistriliiga title in the 2018 season.

International career
Avilov made his senior international debut for Estonia on 27 December 2014, in a 0–3 away loss to Qatar in a friendly.

Honours

Club
FCI Tallinn
Meistriliiga: 2016
Esiliiga: 2012
Estonian Cup: 2016–17
Estonian Supercup: 2017

Nõmme Kalju
Meistriliiga: 2018
Estonian Supercup: 2019

References

External links

1995 births
Living people
Footballers from Tallinn
Estonian people of Russian descent
Estonian footballers
Association football defenders
Esiliiga players
Meistriliiga players
FCI Tallinn players
Nõmme Kalju FC players
Estonia youth international footballers
Estonia under-21 international footballers
Estonia international footballers